Camillo Migliori, best known as Camillo Milli (1 August 1929 – 20 January 2022) was an Italian stage, film and television actor.

Life and career 
Born in Milan, Milli formed under Giorgio Strehler at the Piccolo Teatro di Milano, where he debuted in 1951 and where he was active until 1953. In the 1960s and in the 1970s he worked intensively with director Luigi Squarzina and at the Teatro Stabile in Genoa, specializing in the Carlo Goldoni repertoire. Milli was also active as a  character actor in films, mainly cast in humorous roles, often as a sidekick of Paolo Villaggio. On television, he is best known for the role of Ugo Monti in the Canale 5 TV series CentoVetrine.

Milli died from COVID-19 complications on 20 January 2022, at the age of 92.

Selected filmography 
 Girls of Today (1955)
 The Mattei Affair (1972)
 We Want the Colonels (1973)
 Il domestico (1974)
 In the Name of the Pope King (1977)
 La locandiera (1980)
 Il Marchese del Grillo (1981)
 Sogni mostruosamente proibiti (1982)
 Fantozzi subisce ancora (1983)
 Trainer on the Beach (1984)
 Rimini Rimini (1987)
 Casa mia, casa mia... (1988)
 I Won the New Year's Lottery (1989)
 In the Name of the Sovereign People (1990)
 The Bankers of God: The Calvi Affair (2002)
 L'allenatore nel pallone 2 (2008)
 We Have a Pope (2011)

References

External links 

 

1929 births
2022 deaths
Male actors from Milan
Italian male film actors
Italian male stage actors
Italian male television actors
People of Romagnol descent
People of Piedmontese descent
Deaths from the COVID-19 pandemic in Liguria